Miracle (pt-BR: Milagre) is a 2019 documentary film with Wolfgang Smith, Olavo de Carvalho, and Raphael De Paola.

It was directed by Brazilian Mauro Ventura.

References 

2019 documentary films